Zhang Yan (born 25 July 1967) is a Chinese para table tennis player. He has won five medals from three Paralympic Games (2004, 2008, and 2012).

As a child, Zhang displayed special talent in table tennis, and he was selected to the Zhengzhou youth team, living away from home, when he was just eight years old. When he was ten years old, he had an acute onset of rheumatoid arthritis, which slowly debilitated him.

Personal life
Zhang Yan is married to his national teammate Ren Guixiang. They have a daughter together.

References

1967 births
Living people
Table tennis players at the 2004 Summer Paralympics
Table tennis players at the 2016 Summer Paralympics
Table tennis players at the 2012 Summer Paralympics
Table tennis players at the 2008 Summer Paralympics
Paralympic medalists in table tennis
Medalists at the 2004 Summer Paralympics
Medalists at the 2008 Summer Paralympics
Medalists at the 2012 Summer Paralympics
Chinese male table tennis players
Paralympic gold medalists for China
Paralympic silver medalists for China
Paralympic bronze medalists for China
Paralympic table tennis players of China
Table tennis players from Henan
People from Xinxiang
Table tennis players at the 2020 Summer Paralympics
FESPIC Games competitors